The 1927 Bowling Green Falcons football team was an American football team that represented Bowling Green State Normal School (later Bowling Green State University) as a member of the Northwest Ohio League (NOL) during the 1927 college football season. In their fourth season under head coach Warren Steller, the Falcons compiled a 5–1–1 record (2–1 against NOL opponents), finished in second place out of five teams in the NOL, and outscored opponents by a total of 52 to 14. Ora Knecht was the team captain.

Schedule

References

Bowling Green
Bowling Green Falcons football seasons
Bowling Green Falcons football